Ponikva pri Žalcu is a village in the Municipality of Žalec in east-central Slovenia. It lies in the Ložnica Hills northwest of Žalec. The area is part of the traditional region of Styria. The municipality is now included in the Savinja Statistical Region.

History
The settlement of Ponikva pri Žalcu was created in 1953, when the formerly separate villages of Spodnja Ponikva and Zgornja Ponikva were merged into a single settlement.

Church
The parish church in the settlement is dedicated to Saint Pancras and belongs to the Roman Catholic Diocese of Celje. It was a 16th-century building that was rebuilt in 1925.

References

External links
Ponikva pri Žalcu at Geopedia

Populated places in the Municipality of Žalec